Jamacaria is a genus of parasitic flies in the family Tachinidae. There is one described species in Jamacaria, J. albofenestrata.

Distribution
Jamaica

References

Dexiinae
Tachinidae genera
Diptera of North America
Monotypic Brachycera genera
Taxa named by Charles Howard Curran